El Cid: The Legend (Spanish: El Cid: La leyenda) is a Spanish animated film released on 19 December 2003, written and directed by José Pozo, and based on the historical legend of Rodrigo Díaz de Vivar, also known as El Cid.

Plot 
Ben Yusuf invades the Muslim Taifa of Zaragoza, as the beginning of his campaign to conquer the entire Iberian peninsula. As a result, Prince Al-Mu'tamin flees to Castile to warn king Ferdinand of Yusuf's invasion.

In Castille, Rodrigo Diaz de Vivar is living a life of privilege as the son of a nobleman. He is best friends with prince Sancho and is secretly in a romantic relationship with Jimena, the daughter of count Gormaz. Unfortunately, Gormaz disapproves, and suggests that Jimena should marry the arrogant and self-centered count Ordoñez. As the royal court receives word that the Almoravids of Zaragoza had crossed the Castilian border, Rodrigo gets the opportunity to accompany Sancho, Ordoñez and Gormaz on a scouting mission. Once they set up camp, Gormaz is ambushed by Al-Mu'tamin and his warriors, but Rodrigo intervenes. Once Al-Mu'tamin gets the chance to speak, he is allowed by Sancho to accompany them back to the palace.

Some time later, king Ferdinand dies, and the devious and power-hungry princess Urraca plots to have Sancho killed so that the weak-minded prince Alfonso can be crowned. Gormaz meets with Rodrigo on a balcony, on Jimenas request, where Rodrigo asks for her hand in marriage. Gormaz refuses, and instead challenges Rodrigo to a duel. Rodrigo is hesitant to fight, but when Gormaz insists, he draws his sword. As the two fight, Urraca sends out her lover and servant to assassinate Sancho by stabbing him in the back with a dagger. At the same time, Rodrigo accidentally kills Gormaz. When Jimena witnesses, she becomes distraught and drives Rodrigo away. Later, Alfonso is crowned king, but at the ceremony Rodrigo refuses to kneel before him, and makes Alfonso swear that he had nothing to do with his brother's death. Alfonso does so, but in his rage and humiliation, he banishes Rodrigo without honor.

Rodrigo flees to Zaragoza, where his friends Alvar Fañez and Garces, along with Al-Mu'tamin, reunite with him. At Al-Mu'tamin's suggestion, the four men decide to reclaim the castle of his father, Emir Al-Muqtadir of Zaragoza. With the help of Garces' adopted badger, Ruidoso, Rodrigo and his friends manage to infiltrate the castle and liberate Al-Muqtadir along with other enslaved Muslims of Zaragoza. Soon, Rodrigo begins a campaign to reclaim the castles and lands that had been seized by Yusuf in the name of King Alfonso, as an attempt to regain his lost honor. By doing so, he gathers an army. Rodrigo becomes known as El Cid ("El Señor") among the Muslims.

One day Rodrigo receives a letter from king Alfonso requesting his help. He returns to Castile alone to face the king. Once there, Alfonso informs him that Yusuf has gathered his army in northern Spain, and offers to pardon Rodrigo if he agrees to aid him. Rodrigo objects, claiming that Yusuf intends to seize Valencia. Furious with Rodrigo's defiance, Alfonso orders him imprisoned. Later, Urraca enters Rodrigo's cell and attempts to seduce him, but he resists. She then gives him the same dagger that was used to murder Sancho and releases him, on the condition that he kills Alfonso. Rodrigo enters Alfonso's chamber and, instead of killing him, he displays the dagger and reveals that Urraca orchestrated Sancho's death. Intimidated, Alfonso allows Rodrigo to escape. Rodrigo stops by Jimena's room, but she rejects him, still believing that Rodrigo murdered her father for disapproving of their relationship. Disheartened, Rodrigo escapes Castile.

Music compositions 
The principal musical theme of El Cid: The Legend was composed and interpreted CFC by Luis Fonsi. It is called La fuerza de mi corazón.

They also collaborated with the Spanish rock group Diosa, which had already created music for other Spanish feature films.

Characters 
 Rodrigo Díaz de Vivar/El Cid
 Jimena Díaz
 Yusuf ibn Tashfin/Ben Yusuf
 Prince Al-Mu'tamin
 Emir Al-Muqtadir of Zaragoza
 Count Gormaz
 Count Garcia Ordonez
 King Ferdinand the Great of Castile and León
 Prince Sancho
 King Alfonso VI
 Princess Urraca
 Garces
 Alvar Fanez
 Babieca, Mare of Rodrigo 
 Ruidoso, the Badger of Garces
 Emir Al-Qadir II of Toledo

Historical inaccuracies 
 In real life, Princess Urraca was not regarded as antagonistic and power-hungry. Her position as ruler of the city of Zamora has never been confirmed as well.
 In reality, Alfonso was the one who plotted against Sancho and wanted to be king of both Castile and León.
 Ben Yusuf never had his left eye scarred. His appearance, in reality, was "Brown color, middle height, thin, little beard, soft voice, black eyes, straight nose, lock of Muhammad falling on the top of his ear, eyebrow joined, wooly hair". 
 The left scarred eye was only meant to give Yusuf a threatening and villainous appearance. But like in both reality and the film, his voice is very soft.
 In reality, Prince Al-Mu'tamin was both a prince and a mathematician of the Taifa of Zaragoza. While in the film, he is just a prince.
 Jimena never mentioned her older brother's name Fernando, who was the military leader of the Kingdom of León.
 Count Gormaz's real name is Diego Fernandez.
 Alvar Fañez never accompanied El Cid during his exile.
 In reality, Ben Yusuf was regarded as an honorable man and co-founder of the city of Marrakesh. While in the film, he is a cruel, ruthless, unforgiving, and evil man.
 Ben Yusuf and El Cid never met in person. In reality, El Cid mainly fought against his nephew  Abu 'Abdullah Muhammad and the other two men of Yusuf during the second Battle for Valencia, not by Yusuf himself.
 Muhammad ibn 'A'isha, son of Ben Yusuf and governor of Murcia is never mentioned.
 In reality, the Almoravids had caused two invasions. It was during the second invasion that they had planned to conquer the whole Iberia Peninsula.
 Abu Ahmad Dja'far, the Emir of Valencia never appears, but it is possible that he was already killed by Ben Yusuf. While in reality, he was executed by the order of Rodrigo.
 In reality, Count Garcia Ordonez never had feelings for Jimena. He hates Rodrigo because he publicly humiliated him during the Battle of Cabra and imprisoned him and his remaining knights for 3 days.
 Berenguer Ramon II, Count of Barcelona has never appeared or mentioned in the film.
 Ben Yusuf's real name was Yusuf ibn Tashfin.

Awards
 2004
 Goya Awards - Best Animated Picture

See also 
 Rodrigo Díaz de Vivar
 El cid

External links
 Official Page in (Spanish)
 

2003 films
Spanish animated films
Films based on El Cid
Spanish biographical films
Best Animated Film Goya Award winners
2003 animated films
Films scored by Zacarías M. de la Riva
2000s Spanish films
2000s Spanish-language films